Sadon or Sadung(Tai: ᥔᥤᥖᥨᥒᥰ) is a town located in Waingmaw Township, Myitkyina District of Kachin State, Myanmar (Burma).

References

Townships of Kachin State